
Centre hospitalier or Centre Hospitalier is a French expression denoting a hospital center. Centre hospitalier universitaire is a hospital associated with a university, providing in addition to hospitalization, learning facilities to the university's medical students. 

Centre hospitalier may refer to:

Hospitals

Canada
Centre hospitalier de l'Université Laval
Centre hospitalier de l'Université de Montréal
Centre hospitalier universitaire Sainte-Justine
Centre hospitalier universitaire de Québec
Centre hospitalier universitaire de Sherbrooke
Centre hospitalier de Lachine, also known as Lachine Hospital
Centre hospitalier Pierre-Boucher, also known as Hôpital Pierre Boucher

Others
Centre Hospitalier Universitaire de Grenoble, France
Centre hospitalier universitaire vaudois, Switzerland,  also known as Lausanne University Hospital
Centre Hospitalier de Luxembourg
Centre Hospitalier Universitaire Notre Dame des Secours, Lebanon
Centre Hospitalier et Universitaire de Yaoundé, Cameroon, also known as University Teaching Hospital of Yaounde
Centre Hospitalo-Universitaire Béjaïa, Algeria

See also
Lists of hospitals
List of university hospitals